Psychotria punctata, the dotted wild coffee, is a species of plants in the family Rubiaceae.

Distribution
This species can be found from Southern Somalia to Mozambique and Comoros.

References

 Catalogue of Life
 The Plant List

punctata